Tuvok  is a fictional character in the Star Trek media franchise. One of the main characters on the television series Star Trek: Voyager, Tuvok is a member of the fictional Vulcan species who serves as the ship's second officer, Chief of Security, and Chief Tactical Officer. Tim Russ portrayed Tuvok throughout the show's run from 1995 to 2001, and has also been involved in subsequent portrayals.
Tuvok's backstory is that, up to the time of the first episode, "Caretaker", he was working as an undercover Federation agent in a Maquis group led by Chakotay aboard the Maquis ship the Val Jean. His recovery is the mission Voyager is sent on, a mission that is completed by Janeway at the cost of about one third of her crew and seven years in space, creating the basic setting of the series.

Overview
Over the course of the seven seasons of Voyager Tuvok's character and back-story are revealed. Tuvok is working as a Federation spy aboard the Maquis raider Val Jean, and he is also Voyagers second officer. As portrayed in the Voyager pilot "Caretaker", the mission of Voyager is to retrieve him after that ship goes missing by Deep Space Nine space station. This follows from a narrative established in the Star Trek universe by Star Trek: Deep Space Nine, which was in mid-series at the start of Voyager, as well as Star Trek: The Next Generation, which had concluded its last season in the spring of 1994 before Voyager started. Voyager does retrieve Tuvok, but only because it was abducted to the Delta Quadrant by an extra-galactic alien known as the Caretaker. In the course of the Voyager launch featurette, the crews are used for medical experiments by the Caretaker, the Val Jean is destroyed, and a number of people are killed, including many important positions on Voyager. Tuvok re-joins the crew and the former Maquis are taken aboard Voyager as they try to make their way back to Earth. However, the warp drive is too slow, it will take decades to return to Earth because they are on the other side of the Galaxy. Tuvok will be instrumental in many episodes as a fully trained Starfleet officer and with many talents like the Vulcan mind meld. In the last season it is revealed that Tuvok was discovered by a Maquis leader who tortured him and altered his memories of this event leading to dramatic events in one episode. Because he is married with a family (a family he is separated from as they are in the Alpha quadrant) a number of episodes refer to this back-story.

The cold open to the sixth-season episode "Alice" sees Harry Kim and Tom Paris attempting to guess Tuvok's age; they incorrectly guess at 162 and 133 respectively. Later that season, in the episode "Fury", Kathryn Janeway discovers Tuvok's birthday and tells him, "It's not long before you hit the big three digits"; this suggests that he is under 100 at the time of the episode; however, in the sixth-season finale, "Unimatrix Zero", Tuvok states that he was born on stardate 38774 (equivalent to the year 2264) on Vulcanis, a lunar colony belonging to the Vulcan people. The episode is set in the year 2376, which would make Tuvok 112 years old at the time.

As a teenager, portrayed in flashback sequences during "Gravity" by LeRoy D. Brazile, Tuvok is revealed to have fallen in love with Jara, daughter to a diplomat of the alien species called Terrelians. When Jara did not return his affections, Tuvok's jealousy caused him to be expelled from school and resulted in his parents sending him to the Vulcan master (Joseph Ruskin) to learn emotional control.

Tuvok attended Starfleet Academy in San Francisco. Upon graduation, he was commissioned an ensign at age 29, serving as a junior science officer on the USS Excelsior, under Captain Hikaru Sulu (seen in the episode "Flashback").

During his early service with Starfleet, Tuvok became increasingly uncomfortable associating with non-Vulcans, and he resigned his Starfleet commission in 2298 to pursue his people's Kolinahr regimen of true non-emotion. Tuvok aborted his study of Kolinahr when he went into pon farr six years later, leading to his marriage to T'Pel.

Fifty years later, after much self-examination, Tuvok rejoined Starfleet as a training instructor at Starfleet Academy. His return to Starfleet was marked by a maturity and a reconsideration of the benefits service provided.
After a few years teaching cadets, Tuvok was briefly assigned to the USS Billings with Janeway, until both Janeway and Tuvok were assigned to the USS Wyoming and then the Intrepid-class starship USS Voyager, as Captain (Janeway) and Security and Tactical Officer (Tuvok).

In 2371, Tuvok was assigned to infiltrate the Maquis organization aboard Chakotay's vessel. In the last season, episode four, "Repression", introduced the premise that during the infiltration mission, Tuvok's identity was uncovered by a Maquis counter-intelligence agent, Teero Anaydis (Keith Szarabajka), who used Tuvok as a laboratory specimen for mind-control experiments. Although Tuvok was conscious throughout the experiments, Teero wiped his memory when he had finished, ensuring that Tuvok was unable to remember any details. Following the ordeal, Tuvok was released back among the Maquis. This "time-bomb" was activated by a message hidden in a letter from Tuvok's son that caused the events seven years later in the Voyager timeline.

During an incident involving the Maquis ship and the USS Voyager, both vessels were unwillingly transported to the Delta Quadrant by the enigmatic Caretaker. When the Maquis ship was destroyed by crashing into a Kazon ship to save the USS Voyager, Tuvok was transported off the ship with a handful of other survivors, and resumed his duties as Security and Tactical Officer.

At that time, Voyager also picked up two Delta Quadrant natives, Neelix, a Talaxian, and his partner Kes, from Ocampa. Tuvok recognized Kes' psionic abilities and helped her develop them. Tuvok learned to tolerate Neelix's overly friendly and emotional behavior. Later, a transporter accident fused Tuvok and Neelix together into a new humanoid appropriately named "Tuvix". They were eventually restored to their individual forms under the orders of Captain Janeway, using a procedure devised by the Emergency Medical Hologram and Operations Officer Harry Kim. Tuvok still had issues with Neelix after the experience and many of them are raised again in the episode "Riddles". The two eventually became friends, though it was more apparent from Neelix's end.

At the opening of the fourth season episode "Revulsion", relatively dated 2374, Tuvok was promoted to the rank of lieutenant commander. Before this, in the 1st season, he is referred to as "lieutenant", even though he sometimes wears lieutenant commander rank insignia.

It is learned during "Endgame", the final episode of the series, that Tuvok suffers from a degenerative neurological disease, which can only be cured by undergoing a mind meld with a family member. In 2377, he was still well enough to perform his duties. However, in his elderly years, in an alternate timeline, the disease finally ravaged Tuvok's mind as he was not able to return to the Alpha Quadrant in time for a cure. This left him confined to a mental hospital. However, to save Tuvok among others, Captain Janeway's future self changed history, by finding a way to return the Voyager crew to the Alpha Quadrant back in 2377, the time before his disease worsened. (In the novelization of "Endgame", Tuvok's eldest son Sek arrives aboard Voyager and performs the required mind meld, curing Tuvok.)

Other portrayals
The mirror universe Tuvok appears in the Star Trek: Deep Space Nine third-season episode "Through the Looking Glass" as a member of the Terran Rebellion. He is the only Voyager character whose Mirror counterpart appears onscreen.

In the non-canon Star Trek: Titan novel series, Tuvok joins William Riker on the USS Titan as tactical officer, leaving Voyager. 
His wife joins him. In 2008, Tim Russ brought back Tuvok in the fan film project, Star Trek: Of Gods and Men joining a cast of several Star Trek actors from various series. In 2015, Tim Russ again reprises the role of Tuvok in the fan series, Star Trek: Renegades as head of Section 31 alongside Walter Koenig portraying the ST:TOS character of Pavel Chekov.
In the online role-playing game Star Trek Online, Tim Russ provides voice acting for the character of Tuvok, who plays a major role in the Undine quest line. In that quest line, Tuvok has been promoted to Admiral, and is in command of USS Voyager.

Personality
A full Vulcan, Tuvok has a complex personality, with internal conflict. There is a fair amount of evidence to suggest that he never entirely gained emotional control, and he feels bitterness over his Vulcan heritage. He is also shown to exhibit subdued moments of annoyance, self-doubt, sarcasm and even anger (mostly directed towards Neelix, whose gregarious personality is often at odds with Tuvok's Vulcan stoicism).

Despite this internal conflict, he is shown on numerous occasions to be capable of great nobility and altruism. In several occasions Tuvok is the victim of mind-altering events, medical torture, or other trauma. At one point he is also combined with Neelix, producing the person known as Tuvix. One traumatic life event is described in "Repression", the Maquis terrorist Teero discovers Tuvok and conducts brain-washing and wipes his memory. In "Workforce" he is brain washed and has his memories altered, and he is altered in "Riddle" also. In each case he recovers; however, by "Endgame" he, perhaps unsurprisingly, has a neurological disease.

Examples of traumatic events for the character:
In "Caretaker" Tuvok is abducted and used for medical experiments
"Tuvix" transporter accident combines him with Neelix
"Repression" mind-control activated and previous torture by Maquis revealed
"Riddles" memory wipe

Relationships
Tuvok is married to T'Pel. They married in 2304. They have three sons (one of whom is named Sek) and one daughter named Asil. T'Pel is featured in the Voyager episodes "Persistence of Vision" and "Bliss," both times when Tuvok is hallucinating, and a holographic version of her is featured in "Body and Soul." She is played by actress Marva Hicks.

His son Sek is played by Ronald Robison and is seen in a video message from home in "Repression" (S7E4).

Mind melds
Tuvok conducts the Vulcan mind meld with many characters in Voyager. In one unique case he mind-melds two other characters, Janeway and Seven of Nine in episode "Unimatrix Zero." Over the course of the series he mind-melds with almost the entire bridge crew on different occasions, as well as a variety of aliens.

Examples of meldings:
Tuvok-Suder twice in "Meld"
Tuvok-Janeway "Flashback"
Tuvok-Chakotay twice in "Repression"
Tuvok-Paris ("Ex Post Facto")
Tuvok-Torres, twice; "Repression" and in "Random Thoughts"
Tuvok-Kes, at least twice: "Warlord", "Cold Fire" and "The Gift"
Tuvok-Janeway-Seven of Nine 
Tuvok-Seven of Nine in "Infinite Regress" and "Workforce, Part I"
Tuvok-Guill, with a non-crew alien in "Random Thoughts"
There are several other examples in the series.

Not all mind melds appear consensual, for example the Tuvok-Chakotay mind meld in "Repression" is shown being done after a struggle and it puts Chakotay into a coma for many hours, and the second time is also involuntary. He also forcibly mind-melds with many former Maquis, putting them in temporary comas. In "Think Tank," Tuvok attempts a mind meld apparently as an interrogation technique but it is not stated if it is consensual; he does describe the prisoners as "unusually resistant" to the mind melds, and Janeway instructs him to "Hold off on the torture." In the episode "Critical Care" (S7E5) he threatens a prisoner with a mind meld.

Reception
In 2018, TheWrap ranked Tuvok as the 23rd-best character of Star Trek overall, noting a character that struggled with deep emotions yet remained a loyal and disciplined friend.

In 2021, Variety said that Tuvok was "simply amazing" and praising actor Tim Russ's presentation of the character as "brilliant."

Notes

External links

Black people in television
Fictional lieutenant commanders
Fictional lieutenants
Star Trek: Voyager characters
Star Trek: Deep Space Nine characters
Vulcans
Starfleet officers
Starfleet lieutenant commanders
Starfleet lieutenants
Television characters introduced in 1995
Fictional police officers
Male characters in television
Fictional people from the 23rd-century
Fictional people from the 24th-century

de:Figuren im Star-Trek-Universum#Lieutenant Commander Tuvok